General elections were held in Cuba on 1 November 1916. Mario García Menocal was re-elected in the presidential election, whilst the National Conservative Party and the Liberal Party both won 27 seats in the House of Representatives.

Results
Of the population of 2.6 million, only 796,636 – less than a third – were registered to vote. Of these 353,002 voted in the elections, a voter turnout of 44.31%.

Senate

House of Representatives

References

Cuba
General
Presidential elections in Cuba
Parliamentary elections in Cuba
Cuba
Election and referendum articles with incomplete results